Emmanuèle Bernheim (December 1955 – 10 May 2017) was a French writer. She was the daughter of art collector André Bernheim and sculptress Claude de Soria. In 1993 she won the Prix Médicis with her book Sa femme. She wrote the screenplay of feature films Swimming Pool (2003) and 5x2 (2004), both directed by François Ozon. She lived in Paris and also worked for television.
In 1998 she wrote Vendredi soir (Friday night), a novel that was adapted into film by Claire Denis in 2002. She also worked with Michel Houellebecq on a film adaptation of his novel Platform.

Her memoir Tout s'est bien passé (Everything went fine) was adapted in 2021 for a film of the same name by Ozon.

References

External links 
Imdb profile

1955 births
2017 deaths
French women screenwriters
French screenwriters
French women novelists
20th-century French non-fiction writers
21st-century French non-fiction writers
20th-century French women writers
21st-century French women writers
Prix Médicis winners
Chevaliers of the Ordre des Arts et des Lettres